Dennis McFarland (born May 13, 1949) is an American novelist and short story writer. His novels include Nostalgia, Letter from Point Clear, Prince Edward, Singing Boy, A Face at the Window, School for the Blind and The Music Room. His short fiction has appeared in The American Scholar, The New Yorker, Prize Stories: the O’Henry Awards, Best American Short Stories and elsewhere. He has received a fellowship from the National Endowment for the Arts and the Wallace E. Stegner Fellowship from Stanford University.

Life
McFarland was born in Mobile, Alabama and grew up on a chicken farm. He attended Brooklyn College, where he studied music and composition, as well as Goddard College, where he received his M.F.A. in creative writing. He met the writer and poet Michelle Blake at Goddard and they married in 1983. Together they raised two children and are still married, living now in rural Vermont. They have a small dog with a big underbite.

Career
McFarland's debut novel The Music Room (1990) was a national bestseller, hailed by the New York Times Book Review as "a rare pleasure...A novel of almost organic integrity...Remarkable from its beginning to its surprising, satisfying end." The Hollywood producer Scott Rudin bought the rights and the playwright Robbie Bates was commissioned to write the screenplay.

McFarland's other novels have each been critically acclaimed. His most recent novel, Nostalgia (2013), was described in the New York Times Book Review as "searing, poetic and often masterly...a perfect Civil War novel for our time, or any time." It is the inspiration for a feature film currently underway by River Road.

His short stories have appeared in The American Scholar, The New Yorker, Prize Stories: the O’Henry Awards, Best American Short Stories, and elsewhere.

He has taught writing at Stanford University, where he was a Stegner Fellow, as well as Emerson College. In 1991, he received a fellowship from the National Endowment for the Arts.

Works

Novels 
 The Music Room (1990)
School for the Blind (1994)
A Face at the Window (1997)
Singing Boy (2001)
Prince Edward (2004)
Letter from Point Clear (2007)
 Nostalgia (2013)

Anthologies 
 Prize Stories: The O'Henry Awards (1990)
 "Nothing to Ask For," Best American Short Stories (1990)
 "A Gentle Plea for Chaos," A Few Thousand Words about Love (1998)

References

External links
 Official Dennis McFarland website
 Dennis McFarland at the Random House website
 Books by Dennis McFarland at Open Library
 Dennis McFarland's stories at The American Scholar

Living people
20th-century American novelists
21st-century American novelists
American male novelists
Goddard College alumni
Brooklyn College alumni
Stanford University alumni
Stanford University faculty
20th-century American male writers
21st-century American male writers
1949 births